David Đurak (born 9 March 2000) is a Croatian football midfielder who plays for Slovenian second tier-side Krško.

References

2000 births
Living people
Footballers from Zagreb
Association football midfielders
Croatian footballers
NK Međimurje players
NŠ Mura players
NK Krško players
First Football League (Croatia) players
Slovenian PrvaLiga players
Slovenian Second League players
Croatian expatriate footballers
Expatriate footballers in Sweden
Croatian expatriate sportspeople in Sweden
Expatriate footballers in Slovenia
Croatian expatriate sportspeople in Slovenia